The 1970 National Soccer League season was the forty-seventh season under the National Soccer League (NSL) name. The season began in late April and concluded in early November with the NSL Championship final. The regular-season title was clinched by Toronto Croatia by finishing first throughout the regular season. In the playoffs, the championship title was won by Hamilton Croatia after defeating Toronto Croatia. The NSL Cup was secured by Toronto First Portuguese after defeating Toronto Hellas.

Overview 
Before the commencement of the season, a dispute emerged between the National Soccer League (NSL) and the Ontario Soccer Association (OSA) over a variety of issues during the OSA's annual meeting. At the meeting, the NSL's delegation requested that the league receive more representatives in future OSA meetings and a percentage of the gate earnings from friendly matches involving touring European teams. All of the NSL's requests were denied, and in addition, the league was required to recruit match officials from the local Referees Society. The league's circuit become centered around a Montreal–London corridor with the league expanding to the Ottawa region for the first time in its history. 

The Ottawa franchise was given to Ottawa Sons of Italy, who were the 1969 champions of the Ottawa-Rideau Soccer League. Hamilton received further representation with the acceptance of Hamilton Apollos and Hamilton Croatia. Hamilton Croatia previously competed in the Inter-City Soccer League. The NSL retained its presence in Quebec with the Portuguese de Quebec of Montreal replacing Montreal Inter-Italia. Two notable absentees were Toronto Italia and Sudbury Italia as both were given a leave of absence to settle their financial troubles. Another departing club was Arsenal Portuguese Oakville.  

Reports were also circulating of a potential national Canadian championship featuring champions from the NSL, and the Western Canada Soccer League. The NSL began to experience an increase in match attendance since their initial decrease and stagnation in the mid-1960s. The Toronto-based teams at Stanley Park averaged the highest amount with an average of 1000 per match followed by London which averaged around 680 spectators.

Teams

Coaching changes

Standings

Playoffs

Finals

Cup  
The cup tournament was a separate contest from the rest of the season, in which all fourteen teams took part. The tournament would conclude in a final match for the Cup.

Finals

References

External links
RSSSF CNSL page
thecnsl.com - 1970 season

1970 domestic association football leagues
National Soccer League
1970